Scox may refer to:

 Scox, an alternate spelling of Shax, a figure in demonology
 SCOX, the NASDAQ stock ticker for the SCO Group